The Widden Stakes is an Australian Turf Club Group 3  Thoroughbred horse race, for two-year-old fillies, held with set weights with penalties conditions, over a distance of 1100 metres at Rosehill Racecourse in Sydney, Australia in February. Total prize money for the race is A$160,000.

History

Name

The race is named after Widden Stud, where many of Australia's champion thoroughbreds have stood.

Two fillies have captured the Widden Stakes – Golden Slipper Stakes double: Overreach (2013) and Mossfun (2014)

Distance
1943–1972 - 5 furlongs (~1000 metres)
1973–2004 - 1000 metres
2005–2007 - 1100 metres 
2008 - 1000 metres
2009  onwards - 1100 metres

Grade

1943–1978 -  Principal Race
1979–2013 -  Listed Race
2014 onwards - Group 3

Venue
 1943–2004 - Randwick Racecourse
 2005–2007 - Rosehill Gardens Racecourse
 2008–2011 - Randwick Racecourse
 2012 - Warwick Farm Racecourse
 2013–2019 - Rosehill Gardens Racecourse
 2020 - Randwick Racecourse
 2021 onwards - Rosehill Gardens Racecourse

Winners

 2022 - Queen Of The Ball 
 2021 - Mallory 
2020 - Away Game 
2019 - Amercement 
2018 - Fiesta 
2017 - Teaspoon 
2016 - Honesty Prevails  
2015 - Fireworks      
2014 - Mossfun           
2013 - Overreach            
2012 - Driefontein        
2011 - Satin Shoes       
2010 - Georgette Silk    
2009 - Horizons                        
2008 - Delta Girl           
2007 - Superfly             
2006 - Churchill Downs      
2005 - Pasikatera           
2004 - Econsul
2003 - race not held
2002 - Secret Land          
2001 - Riona                
2000 - Miss Bussell         
1999 - Miss Thunderstood    
1998 - Countess Christie    
1997 - Manana               
1996 - Empower              
1995 - Unison               
1994 - Stitches             
1993 - Dynasty              
1992 - Lilting              
1991 - Merry Shade          
1990 - Bundle Of Thanks     
1989 - Triscay              
1988 - Momentaire           
1987 - Kazarne              
1986 - Whilodge             
1985 - Magic Flute          
1984 - Super Swift          
1983 - Rivage               
1982 - Biscarina            
1981 - Surpassing           
1980 - Flight Of Life       
1979 - Shaybisc             
1978 - Golden Topic         
1977 - Peeping              
1976 - †Princess Talaria / Lady Lyndal                
1975 - Rainbeam             
1974 - Denise's Joy         
1973 - Gretel               
1972 - Magic Beam           
1971 - Blue Mountain        
1970 - Royal Endeavour      
1969 - †Summer Play / Final Bid                  
1968 - Celina               
1967 - Topmost              
1966 - On Par               
1965 - Red Mittens          
1964 - Suzanne              
1963 - All Gold             
1962 - Heirloom             
1961 - April Wonder         
1960 - No Match             
1959 - My Rachael           
1958 - Chateau Clair        
1957 - Foison               
1956 - Estrina              
1955 - Royal Maureen        
1954 - Interesting          
1953 - Queen Of All         
1952 - Reflected Glory      
1951 - Celebrated           
1950 - White Lightning      
1949 - Magic Carpet         
1948 - Pantomime            
1947 - Oasis                
1946 - Kindly Light         
1945 - race not held      
1944 - Genista              
1943 - Birthright         

† Run in divisions

See also
 List of Australian Group races
 Group races

External links 
First three place getters Widden Stakes (ATC)

References

Horse races in Australia
Flat horse races for two-year-olds